Modthryth, Thryth ('strength', cf. Old Norse Þrúðr, the daughter of Thor), and Fremu are reconstructed names for a character who figures as the queen of King Offa in Beowulf.

Naming problem: Modthryth, Thryth, or Fremu?
The reason for the usage of both Thryth and the compound name Modthryth is that the latter name is an emendation by Klaeber (1953). Mod appears just before Þryð on line 1932 of the poem, where she is introduced, and scholars are divided as to whether mod is part of her name, or a separate word.

The queen of the eighth-century Mercian king Offa in the thirteenth-century Vitae duorum Offarum, which portrays both this Offa and his fifth-century namesake, is called Quendrida, a somewhat flawed Latin rendering of Cynethryth, the actual name of Offa's wife. The author, moreover, etymologised the word as consisting of the words quen 'queen' and the personal name Drida: Quendrida, id est regina Drida. This parallel has sometimes been taken as a further argument that the Offa of Beowulf had a queen called Thryth and that the passage was intended as a veiled reference to the eighth-century queen.

More recently, R. D. Fulk has challenged the long-held view that the queen was named either Modthryth or Thryth, pointing out difficulties with the ending -o, its implications for the overall syntax, and the weaknesses of the Drida argument. Instead, he revives the suggestion made by Ernst A. Kock in 1920 that  is not an adjective modifying  "the people's princess" and meaning "excellent" (which would be inappropriate at this stage of the narrative), but her actual name. On the basis of such parallels as  "bore arrogance" (Old English Genesis A line 2240b), he likewise treats  as a common noun, although this necessitates an emendation of the ending -o to -a. Eric Weiskott has challenged Fulk's reinterpretation on grounds of poetic syntax, concluding that the queen remains anonymous.

From wicked princess to virtuous queen
The relevant passage immediately follows, almost interrupts, a favourable description of Hygelac's queen Hygd. First, the portrayal focuses on the princess's character in her early days before her marriage to Offa. She is a powerful and vengeful woman who punishes any man beneath her station who dares to look her directly in the eye:

She changes her ways after being married to Offa, becoming a great queen and gaining fame for her good deeds:

Based on the similarity of name, the portrayal of 'Thryth' has been interpreted as an attack upon Offa of Mercia's wife Cynethryth.

Alternate Readings of Modthryth 
While scholars such as R. D. Fulk read Modthryth in terms of the limiting tamed virago motif, it has been suggested that this reflects preconceptions among scholars. Erin Sebo and Cassandra Schilling point out that many of the negative attitudes to her are based on phrases that are unclear or seem to be the result of scribal error. They note that the Beowulf Poet introduces Modthryth by stressing "the importance of her role in the prosperity of the community, describing her as “fremu folces cwen” (1932a), a “good queen of the people”."  Helen Damico sees Modthryth as encompassing both the threatening and benevolent aspects of the Wælcyrge: she "parallels the evolution of the archetypal figure that Modthrytho is modelled upon, the progression of fierce war-demon to gold-adorned warrior-queen". Mary Dockray-Miller argues that she is "neither a reformed peace pledge, nor a heroic Valkyrie. Instead, her character both confirms and denies a masculine economy that depends on women as commodities [thus] Modþryðo's masculine performance manages to subvert the usual use of women as objects in exchanges between men". Another feminist scholar, Pat Belanoff, comments upon the Old English tradition of strong female characters and images, positing that "[w]ithin the resources available to Anglo-Saxon poets was a traditional image of the female: an intelligent strong minded, usually glowing or shining, verbally adept woman whose actions are resolute and self-initiated". Considering that the poem itself includes similar descriptions of Modthryth, stating that she is "famous for her good deeds and conduct in life" certain ignored possibilities for this character are being explored. Even early scholars, such as Bonjour, note that, while many characters in the poem fall from greatness, she is the only one who changes her negative traits to become great.

Taking such criticism into account, it is apparent that complexities hitherto denied to Modthryth are being explored through the revision of feminist scholars -thus uncovering nuances of gendered power that are implicit within the poem. With this in mind, Modthryth no longer acts solely as a foil to the good queen Hygd, but contributes to a tradition of strong female figures. Evidently, it would be profitable to view Modthryth as comparable to such figures as Judith or even the Old Norse Valkyrie-brides.

See also

Beowulf: Hygd, Wealhþeow, Freawaru, Hildeburh
Beowulf: Grendel's mother
Eadburh, daughter of King Offa of Mercia and wife to King Beorhtric of Wessex
Book of Judith
Valkyrie

References

Primary sources
Beowulf, ed. and tr. Michael Swanton, Beowulf. 2nd ed. New York, 1997. Swanton's prose translation is re-arranged as verse-lines above.
Beowulf. Trans. Fulk, R. D. Ed. Fulk. The Beowulf Manuscript: Complete Texts and the Fight at Finnsburg. Cambridge and London: Harvard UP, 2010. Print. 
Beowulf: A Verse Translation. Trans. Heaney, Seamus. New York: W. W. Norton & Company, 2002. Print.

Further reading
Bennett, Judith M. ‘Medievalism and Feminism.’ Speculum 68. 2 (1993): 309–31. Jstor. Web. 7 November 2015.
Damico, Helen., Alexandra Hennessey Olsen. New Readings on Women in Old English Literature. Bloomington and Indianapolis: Indiana UP, 1990. Print.
Eliason, Norman E. "The 'Thryth-Offa Digression' in Beowulf."  In Franciplegius: medieval and linguistic studies in honor of Francis Peabody Magoun, ed. by Jr. J.B. Bessinger and R.P. Creed. New York: New York University Press, 1965.
Fulk, Robert D. "The Name of Offa's Queen: Beowulf 1931–2." Anglia: Zeitschrift für englische Philologie 122.4 (2004): 614–39.
Hashimoto, Shuichi. "On Norman E. Eliason's 'The "Thryth-Offa Episode" in Beowulf." Sophia English Studies [Japan] 7 (1982): 1–10.
Jeffrey, Jane E. 'Teaching Medieval Women: An Introduction.' College Literature 28. 2 (2001): 66–69. Jstor. Web. 7 November 2015.
Jordan, Jessica. "Women Refusing the Gaze: Theorizing Thryth's "Unqueenly Custom" in Beowulf and The Bride's Revenge in Quentin Tarantino's Kill Bill, Volume I." The Heroic Age: A Journal of Early Medieval Northwestern Europe, heroicage.org, Issue 9. October 2006.
Leneghan, Francis. "The Poetic Purpose of the Offa-Digression in "Beowulf"", "The Review of English Studies" 60 (2009), 538–60..
Moore, Bruce. "The 'Thryth-Offa Digression' in Beowulf."  Neophilologus 64 (1980): 127–33.

Scheck, Helen., Virginia Blanton. ‘Women.’ Eds. Stodnick and Trlling. 2012. 265–79. eBook.

Weiskott, Eric. "Three Beowulf Cruces: healgamen, fremu, Sigemunde." Notes & Queries 58 (2011): 3–7

Characters in Beowulf
English heroic legends